FHJ may refer to:
 Fahnenjunker, a German military rank
 Fatehganj, a city in Uttar Pradesh, India
 Fontys Academy of Journalism, in the Netherlands
 Toyota FHJ, a fire truck